Flawed by Design is an American metalcore band from Hickory, North Carolina.

Background 
Flawed by Design started in late 2011/early 2012 in Hickory, North Carolina, with founding members drummer Shane Atkinson and guitarist Tony Greer, who were former band mates. The band added on vocalist Dillon Reynolds and bassist Davie Huffman in 2012. In 2014, the band entered the studio to record their debut album, A New Creation with producer Jamie King (For Today, Between the Buried and Me, Your Chance to Die). The album was released through Rottweiler Records in January 2015. On August 4, 2015, vocalist Dillon Reynolds and bassist Davie Huffman departed from the band due to creative and personal differences. The band is currently working on a full-length CD with new bassist Bobby Hoyle and vocalist Nick Ellis.

Members 
Current
 Tony Greer – guitars (2011–present)
 Shane Atkinson – drums (2011–present)
 Nick Ellis – vocals (2017–present)
 Bobby Hoyle – bass (2017–present)

Former
 Davie Huffman – bass (2012–2015)
 Dillon Reynolds – vocals (2012–2015)

Discography 
Studio albums
 A New Creation (2015, Rottweiler Records)
 Resurrection   (2021, Flawed by Design Music)

Singles
"Thief Among Kings" (2017)
"Keep It Steady" (2017)

Compilation appearances
 Metal from the Dragon (Vol. 2) (2017, The Bearded Dragon Productions)
 Metal for a Fallen World (Vol. 1) (2018, The Covenant Metal Show)
 Rottweiler Records The Pack (Vol. 1) (2016, Rottweiler Records)
 United We Skate (Vol. 3) (2015, Thumper Punk Records SkyBurnsBlack Records)

References

External links 
Top Albums of 2015 on Untombed Zine
Best Christian Album of 2015

Musical groups established in 2011
American Christian metal musical groups
Rottweiler Records artists
2011 establishments in North Carolina